Sigurbjörnsson is a surname of Icelandic origin. Notable people with the surname include:

Àlex Sigurbjörnsson (born 1988), Spanish rower
Bergur Sigurbjörnsson (1917–2005), Icelandic magazine editor and politician
Eiður Sigurbjörnsson (born 1990), Icelandic footballer
 

Icelandic-language surnames